Nicol Drysdale Stenhouse (27 June 1806 – 18 February 1873) was a Scottish-born lawyer, writer and literary patron in colonial Australia.

Stenhouse was born in Coldstream, Berwickshire, Scotland and was a writer of taste and a great lover of literature. He was clerk to Sir William Hamilton, 9th Baronet when the latter was practising as an advocate in Edinburgh. He was also a friend of  Thomas De Quincey. Having embraced the legal profession, he emigrated to New South Wales, and practised for many years as an attorney and solicitor in Sydney. He was a veritable Mæcenas to many needy and struggling literary men in Sydney. Not long before his death he was, on the motion of that great scholar, Dr. Charles Badham, appointed an examiner in the Faculty of Law and a member of the senate of the University of Sydney. He succeeded the late Dr. John Woolley, with whom he was on warm terms of friendship, as president of the Sydney Mechanics' School of Arts, and held the position from 1867 to 1873. Stenhouse died on 18 February 1873 in Balmain, New South Wales.

References

1806 births
1873 deaths
Australian writers
People from Berwickshire
People from Coldstream
Scottish emigrants to colonial Australia
Academic staff of the University of Sydney
Mayors of Balmain
19th-century Australian politicians
Australian book and manuscript collectors